Toni Karačić (born 6 December 1974) is a Bosnian professional football manager. He was previously manager of Posušje.

Managerial statistics

References

External links
Toni Karačić at Soccerway

Living people
1974 births
People from Široki Brijeg
Croats of Bosnia and Herzegovina
Bosnia and Herzegovina football managers
Premier League of Bosnia and Herzegovina managers
NK Široki Brijeg managers
HŠK Posušje managers